Juozas Domarkas (born 28 July 1936) is a Lithuanian musician, music teacher and conductor, and a professor at the Lithuanian Academy of Music and Theatre (LMTA).

Life 
Domarkas was born in Varkaliai, Nausodis eldership, Plungė District Municipality. From 1955 to 1960 he studied the clarinet at the Lithuanian Conservatory (forerunner of the present LMTA) and in 1965 he studied conducting at the Leningrad Conservatory with Ilya Musin. In 1963 he trained in Moscow with Igor Markevitch. From 1964 Domarkas was artistic director and principal conductor of the Lithuanian National Symphony Orchestra in Vilnius. From 1968 he has taught at the Lithuanian Academy of Music and Theatre where since 1995 he has also held the professorship of conducting in the music faculty. From 1972 to 1991 he also directed the student symphony orchestra of the music high school.

Distinctions 
Prizes
 1974: State Prize of Soviet Lithuania
 1998: Art Prize of the Lithuanian Government
 2000: Lithuanian National Prize for Culture and Arts

Orders
 1994: Order of the Lithuanian Grand Duke Gediminas, 4th Class
 1998: Order of the Lithuanian Grand Duke Gediminas, 1st Class
 2006: Knight's Cross of the Order of Merit of the Republic of Poland

Honours 
 2003: Citizen of Honour of the Plungė District Municipality

Sources 
Audronė Žigaitytė-Nekrošienė: Juozas Domarkas - Visuotinė lietuvių enciklopedija, T. V (Dis-Fatva). – Vilnius: Mokslo ir enciklopedijų leidybos institutas, 2004, 62 psl.

Lithuanian musicians
Lithuanian conductors (music)
1936 births
Living people
People from Plungė District Municipality
21st-century conductors (music)